Pittston Area High School is a public high school located in Pittston, Pennsylvania. The school is part of the Pittston Area School District and it serves about 1,100 students in grades 9 to 12.

References

Educational institutions in the United States with year of establishment missing
Public high schools in Pennsylvania
Schools in Luzerne County, Pennsylvania
Pittston, Pennsylvania